Kindred  (1979) is a novel by American writer Octavia E. Butler that incorporates time travel and is modeled on slave narratives. Widely popular, it has frequently been chosen as a text by community-wide reading programs and book organizations, and for high school and college courses.

The book is the first-person account of a young African-American writer, Dana, who is repeatedly transported in time between her Los Angeles, California home in 1976 with her white husband and an early 19th-century Maryland plantation on the Eastern Shore. There she meets some of her ancestors: a proud, free Black woman and a white planter who forces her into slavery and concubinage. As Dana stays for longer periods in the past, she becomes intimately entangled with the plantation community. Dana makes hard choices to survive slavery and to ensure her return to her own time.

Kindred  explores the dynamics and dilemmas of antebellum slavery from the sensibility of a late 20th-century Black woman, who is aware of its legacy in contemporary American society. Through the two interracial couples who form the emotional core of the story, the novel also explores the intersection of power, gender, and race issues, and speculates on the prospects of future egalitarianism.

While most of Butler's work is classified as science fiction, Kindred crosses genre boundaries and is also classified as African-American literature. Butler has categorized the work as "a kind of grim fantasy."

Plot
Kindred scholars have noted that the novel's chapter headings suggest something "elemental, apocalyptic, archetypal about the events in the narrative," thus giving the impression that the main characters are participating in matters greater than their personal lives.

Prologue
Dana, a young black woman, wakes up in the hospital with her arm amputated. Police deputies question her about the circumstances and ask her whether her husband Kevin, a white man, beats her. Dana tells them that she lost her arm because of an accident and that Kevin is not to blame. When Kevin visits her, they acknowledge being afraid to tell the truth because no one would believe them.

The River
Their lives were altered on June 9, 1976, the day of Dana's twenty-sixth birthday, in the year the United States was celebrating its bicentennial. The day before, Dana and Kevin had moved into a house a few miles away from their old apartment in Los Angeles. While unpacking, Dana suddenly became dizzy. 

When she comes to her senses, she is at the edge of a wood, near a river where a small, red-haired boy is drowning. Dana wades in after him, drags him to shore, and tries to revive him. The boy's mother begins screaming and hitting Dana, accusing her of killing her son, whom she identifies as Rufus. The boy recovers and a white man arrives and points a gun at Dana, terrifying her. She becomes dizzy again and regains consciousness at her new house with Kevin beside her. Kevin, shocked at her disappearance and reappearance, tries to understand if the episode was real or a hallucination.

The Fire
Dana washes off the filth from the river but dizziness marks another transition. This time, she comes to in a bedroom where a red-haired boy has set his bedroom drapes aflame. He is Rufus, now a few years older. Dana quickly puts out the fire. Rufus confesses he set fire to the drapes to get back at his father for beating him after he stole a dollar. As they talk, Rufus casually uses the N-word to refer to Dana, which upsets her, but she  comes to realize that she has been transported in time as well as space, specifically to Maryland, circa 1815. 

Rufus advises her to seek refuge at the home of Alice Greenwood and her mother, free blacks who live at the edge of the plantation. Dana realizes that both Rufus and Alice are her ancestors, as they will have a child from whom she'll descend. At the Greenwoods', Dana witnesses a group of young white men smash down the door, drag out Alice's enslaved father, and whip him brutally for being there without papers. One of the men punches Alice's mother when she refuses his advances. The men leave, Dana comes out of hiding, and helps Alice's mother. She is confronted by one of the white men, who attempts to rape her. Fearing for her life, Dana luckily returns to 1976. 

Though hours have passed for her, Kevin assures her that she has been gone only for a few minutes. The next day, Kevin and Dana prepare for the possibility that she may travel back in time again by packing a survival bag for her and by doing some research on Black history in books in their home library.

The Fall
In a flashback, Dana recounts how she met Kevin while doing minimum-wage temporary jobs at an auto-parts warehouse. Kevin becomes interested in Dana when he learns she is a writer and they become friends, although coworkers are judgmental because he is white. The two find they have much in common; both are orphans, both love to write, and both their families disapproved of their aspiration to become writers. They become lovers.

Again in 1976, Kevin is preparing to go to the library to find out how to forge "free papers" for Dana. She feels dizzy and Kevin holds her, traveling with her to the past. They find Rufus writhing in pain from a broken leg. Next to him is a black boy named Nigel, whom they send to the main house for help. 

Rufus reacts with violent disbelief when he finds out that Kevin and Dana are married: whites and blacks are not allowed to marry in his time, although he knows many white men have enslaved black mistresses. Dana and Kevin explain to Rufus that they are from the future and prove it by showing the dates stamped on the coins Kevin carries in his pockets. Rufus promises to keep their identities a secret, and Dana tells Kevin to pretend that he is her owner. When Tom Weylin, Rufus's father, arrives with his slave Luke to retrieve Rufus, Kevin introduces himself. Weylin grudgingly invites him to dinner. 

At the Weylin plantation, Rufus's mother Margaret fusses about her son's well-being and, jealous of the attention Rufus shows Dana, sends the young woman to the cookhouse. There, Dana meets two house slaves: Sarah, the cook; and Carrie, her mute daughter. Unsure as to what their next act should be, Kevin accepts Weylin's offer to become Rufus's tutor. Kevin and Dana stay on the plantation for several weeks. They observe the relentless cruelty and torture that Weylin, Margaret, and the spoiled Rufus use against the slaves. They are sadistic and evil, they feel entitled to treat the slaves as property. Weylin catches Dana reading and whips her mercilessly. The dizziness overcomes her before Kevin can reach her and she travels back to 1976 alone.

The Fight
In a flashback, Dana remembers how she and Kevin were married. Both of their families opposed the marriage due to ethnic bias. While Kevin's reactionary sister is prejudiced against African Americans, Dana's uncle abhors the idea of a white man eventually inheriting his property. Only Dana's aunt favors the union, as it would mean that her niece's children would have lighter skin. Kevin and Dana marry without any family present.

After eight days of being home recuperating without Kevin, Dana time travels to find Rufus getting beaten up by Isaac Jackson, the enslaved husband of Alice Greenwood. Dana learns that Rufus had attempted to rape Alice, who was once his childhood friend. Dana convinces Isaac not to kill Rufus, and Alice and Isaac run away while Dana gets Rufus home. She learns that it has been five years since her last visit and that Kevin has left Maryland. Dana nurses Rufus back to health in return for his help delivering letters to Kevin. Five days later, Alice and Isaac are caught. 

Isaac is mutilated and sold to traders heading to Mississippi. Alice is beaten, savaged by dogs, and enslaved as penalty for helping Isaac escape. Rufus, who claims to love Alice, buys her, and orders Dana to nurse her back to health. Dana does so with much care. When Alice finally recovers, she curses Dana for not letting her die, and is wracked with grief for her lost husband.

Rufus orders Dana to convince Alice to have sex with him now that she has recovered. Dana speaks with Alice, outlining her three options: she can refuse and be whipped and raped; she can acquiesce; or she can try again to run away. Injured and terrified by her previous punishment, Alice gives in to Rufus's desire and becomes his concubine. While in his bedroom, Alice learns that Rufus did not send Dana's letters to Kevin, and tells Dana. Furious that Rufus lied to her, Dana runs away to find Kevin, but is betrayed by a jealous slave, Liza. Rufus and Weylin capture her and Weylin whips her brutally. 

When Weylin learns that Rufus failed to keep his promise to Dana to send her letters, he writes to Kevin and tells him that Dana is on the plantation. Kevin comes to retrieve Dana, but Rufus stops them on the road and threatens to shoot them. He tells Dana that she can't leave him again. The dizziness overcomes Dana and she travels back to 1976, this time with Kevin.

The Storm
Dana's and Kevin's happy reunion is short-lived, as Kevin has a hard time adjusting to the present after living in the past for five years. He shares a few details of his life in the past with Dana: he witnessed terrible atrocities against slaves, traveled farther up north, worked as a teacher, helped slaves escape, and grew a beard to disguise himself from a lynch mob. Disconcerted about his trouble in re-entering his former world, he grows angry and cold. Deciding to let him work his feelings out, Dana packs a bag in case she time travels again.

Soon enough she finds herself outside the Weylin plantation house in a rainstorm, with a very drunk Rufus lying face down in a puddle. She tries to drag him back to the house, then gets Nigel to help her carry him. At the house, an aged Weylin appoints Dana to nurse Rufus back to health under threat of her life. Suspecting Rufus has malaria and knowing she cannot help much, Dana feeds Rufus the aspirin she has packed to lower his fever. Rufus survives, but remains weak for weeks. Dana learns that Rufus and Alice have had three mixed-race "children of the plantation" and that only one, a boy named Joe, has survived. Alice is pregnant again. Rufus had forced Alice to let the doctor bleed the other two when they had fallen ill, a customary treatment of the time, but it killed them. 

Weylin has a heart attack and Dana is unable to save his life. But, Rufus believes she let Weylin die and sends her to work in the corn fields as punishment. By the time he repents his decision, she has collapsed from exhaustion and is being whipped by the overseer. Rufus appoints Dana as the caretaker of his ailing mother, Margaret. Now the master of the plantation, Rufus sells off some slaves, including Tess, Weylin's former concubine. Dana expresses her anger about that sale, and Rufus explains that his father left debts he must pay. He convinces Dana to use her writing skill to stave off his other creditors. 

Time passes and Alice gives birth to a girl, Hagar, a direct ancestor of Dana. Alice confides that she plans to run away with her children as soon as possible, as she fears that she is forgetting to hate Rufus. Dana convinces Rufus to let her teach his son Joe and some of the slave children how to read. However, when a slave named Sam asks Dana if his younger siblings can join in on the lessons, Rufus sells him off as punishment for flirting with her. When Dana tries to interfere, Rufus hits her. Faced with her own powerlessness over Rufus, she retrieves the knife she has brought from home and slits her wrists in an effort to time travel.

The Rope
 
Dana awakens in Los Angeles, at home, with her wrists bandaged and Kevin by her side. She tells him of her eight months in the plantation, of Hagar's birth, and of the need to keep Rufus alive, as the slaves would be separated and sold if he died. When Kevin asks if Rufus has raped Dana, she responds that he has not, that such an attempt would cause her to kill him, despite the possible consequences. 

Fifteen days later, on the 4th of July, Dana returns to the plantation where she finds that Alice has hanged herself. Alice tried to run away after Dana disappeared, and as punishment Rufus whipped her and told her that he had sold her children. But he had sent to them to stay with his aunt in Baltimore. Racked with guilt about Alice's death, Rufus nearly commits suicide. 

After Alice's funeral, Dana uses that guilt to convince Rufus to free his children by Alice. From that moment on, Rufus keeps Dana at his side almost constantly, having her share meals and teach his children. One day, he finally admits that he wants Dana to replace Alice in his life. He says that unlike Alice, who, despite growing used to Rufus, never stopped plotting to escape him, Dana will see that he is a fair master and eventually stop hating him. Dana, horrified at the thought of forgiving Rufus in this way, flees to the attic to find her knife. Rufus follows her there, and when he attempts to rape her, Dana stabs him twice with her knife. Nigel arrives to see Rufus's death throes, at which point Dana becomes terribly sick and time travels home for the last time. She finds herself in excruciating pain, as her arm has been joined to a wall in the spot where Rufus was holding it.

Epilogue
Dana and Kevin travel to Baltimore to investigate the fate of the Weylin plantation after Rufus's death in archival records, but they find very little: a newspaper notice reporting Rufus's death as a result of his house catching fire, and a Slave Sale announcement listing all the Weylin slaves except Nigel, Carrie, Joe, and Hagar. Dana speculates that Nigel covered up the murder by starting the fire, and feels responsible for the sale of the slaves. To that, Kevin responds that she cannot do anything about the past, and now that Rufus is finally dead, they can return to their peaceful life together.

Characters 

  Edana (Dana) Franklin: A 26-year-old African-American woman writer, she is the protagonist and the narrator of the story. She is married to a white writer named Kevin. She repeatedly travels in time to a slave plantation in antebellum Maryland, where she first encounters a white ancestor as the boy Rufus. There Dana has to make hard compromises to survive and to ensure her life in her own time. 
 Kevin Franklin: Dana's husband is a white writer twelve years older than she. Kevin loves her deeply and became estranged from his family to marry her. When he travels with Dana to the past, he witnesses the brutality of slavery and becomes an abolitionist, also helping slaves escape to freedom.
  Rufus Weylin: The red-haired son of white planter Tom Weylin and his wife; the father owns a Maryland plantation and numerous slaves. As Dana returns, she sees the adult Rufus replace his father as master. Rufus rapes Alice, a free black woman, and their mixed-race daughter Hagar later becomes one of Dana's maternal ancestors. 
 Tom Weylin: The owner of an antebellum Maryland plantation, he is a hard master and father, insisting on obedience from family and slaves. He whips Dana on multiple occasions, and authorizes the selling of his slaves' children. He is likened to Kevin in looks.
 Alice Greenwood (later, Alice Jackson): She was born free and is a proud Black woman. Later she is enslaved as punishment for having helped her enslaved husband Isaac try to escape. Rufus buys Alice and forces her  to become his concubine. Two of their children survive: Joe and Hagar. She hangs herself after Rufus tells her he has sold her children.
 Sarah: The cook of the Weylin household is its domestic manager;  she tries to protect the house slaves while making them work hard. Tom Weylin sold all of Sarah's children except her mute daughter Carrie. 
 Margaret Weylin: The plantation owner's wife indulges their son Rufus. Both she and her husband are abusive to the house slaves. She leaves after her infant twins die and returns with an opium addiction. 
 Hagar Weylin: Rufus and Alice's youngest daughter. Hagar is a direct ancestor of Dana through her maternal line. 
 Luke: A slave at the Weylin plantation who works as Weylin's overseer. Weylin sells him for not being sufficiently obedient. 
 Nigel: The son of Luke and an enslaved woman at the Weylin plantation. He and Rufus were playmates as children. Dana secretly teaches him as a child to read and write. When older, he tries to flee, but is captured. Held at the plantation, he forms a family with Carrie, Sarah's daughter, Carrie.
 Carrie: Sarah's daughter is mute, but she helps Dana find the strength for the hard compromises she must make to survive. She becomes Nigel's wife.
 Liza: An enslaved woman jealous of Dana for what she thinks is special treatment, she snitches on Dana when she runs away. This results in Dana being caught and whipped.
 Tess: An enslaved woman whom Tom Weylin uses sexually. 
 Jake Edwards: One of the white overseers on the Weylin plantation, he also abuses Tess sexually.

Main themes

Realistic depiction of slavery and slave communities 

Kindred  explores how a modern black woman would deal with a slave society, where most black people were considered property; it was a world where "all of society was arrayed against you."
During an interview, Butler said that, while she read slave narratives for background, she believed that if she wanted people to read her book, she would have to present a less violent version of slavery than found in these accounts. 

Scholars of Kindred consider the novel an accurate, fictional account of many slave lives. Concluding that "there probably is no more vivid depiction of life on an Eastern Shore plantation than that found in Kindred," Sandra Y. Govan traces how Butler's book follows the classic patterns of the slave narrative genre: loss of innocence, harsh punishment, strategies of resistance, life in the slave quarters, struggle for education, experience of sexual abuse, realization of white religious hypocrisy, and attempts to escape, with ultimate success. 

Robert Crossley notes that Butler's intense first-person narration deliberately echoes many slave narratives, thereby giving the story "a degree of authenticity and seriousness." Lisa Yaszek sees Dana's visceral first-hand account as a deliberate criticism of earlier depictions of slavery, such as the book and film Gone with the Wind, produced largely by whites, and even the television miniseries Roots, based on a book by African-American writer Alex Haley.

In Kindred, Butler portrays individual slaves as distinctive persons, giving each his or her own story. Robert Crossley says that Butler treats the blackness of her characters as "a matter of course", to resist the tendency of white writers to incorporate African Americans into their narratives just to illustrate a problem or to divorce themselves from charges of racism. Thus, in Kindred the slave community is depicted as a "rich human society": the proud yet victimized freewoman Alice; Sam the field slave, who hopes Dana will teach his brother to read and write; Liza, who frustrates Dana's escape; the bright and resourceful Nigel, Rufus's childhood friend who learns to read from a stolen primer; and, most importantly, Sarah the cook, who Butler develops as a deeply angry yet caring woman subdued only by the threat of losing her last child, the mute Carrie.

Master-slave power dynamics 

Scholars have argued that Kindred complicates a common representations of chattel slavery as an oppressive system dominated by the master and economic goals. Pamela Bedore notes that while Rufus seems to hold all the power in relationship to Alice, she never wholly surrenders to him. Alice's suicide can be read as her "final upsetting of their power balance", and escaping him through death. By placing Kindred in comparison to other Butler novels such as Dawn, Bedore explores the bond between Dana and Rufus as re-envisioning slavery as a "symbiotic" interaction between slave and master: since neither character can exist without the other, they are continually forced to collaborate in order to survive. The master does not simply control the slave but depends on her. From the side of the slave, Lisa Yaszek notices conflicting emotions: in addition to fear and contempt, affection may be felt for the familiar whites and their occasional kindnesses. A slave who collaborates with the master to survive is not reduced to a "traitor to her race" or to a "victim of fate."

Kindred portrays the exploitation of black female sexuality as a main site of the historic struggle between master and slave. Diana Paulin describes Rufus's attempts to control Alice's sexuality as a means to recapture power he lost when she chose Isaac as her sexual partner. Compelled to submit sexually to Rufus, Alice divorces her desire to preserve a sense of self. Similarly, Dana reconstructs her sexuality while time traveling to survive. While in the present, Dana chooses her husband and enjoys sex with him. In the past, her status as a black female forced her to submit to the master as sexual property. Rufus as an adult attempts to control Dana's sexuality, and attempts rape to use her to replace Alice. Dana's killing Rufus is the way she rejects the role of female slave, distinguishing herself from those who did not have the power to say "no."

Critique of American history 

Scholarship on Kindred often touches on its critique of the official history of the formation of the United States as an erasure of the raw facts of slavery. Lisa Yaszek places Kindred as emanating from two decades of heated discussion over what constituted American history, with a series of scholars pursuing the study of African-American historical sources to create "more inclusive models of memory." Missy Dehn Kubitschek argues that Butler set the story during the bicentennial of the adoption of the Declaration of Independence of the United States to suggest that the nation should review its history in order to resolve its current racial strife. Robert Crossley believes that Butler dates Dana's final trip to her Los Angeles home on the Bicentennial to connect the personal with the social and the political. The power of this national holiday to erase the grim reality of slavery is negated by Dana's living understanding of American history, which makes all her previous knowledge of slavery through mass media and books inadequate. Yaszek further notes that Dana throws away all her history books about African-American history on one of the trips back to her California home, as she finds them to be inaccurate in portraying slavery. Instead, Dana reads books about the Holocaust and finds these books to be closer to her ordeals as a slave. 
 
In several interviews, Butler has mentioned that she wrote Kindred to counteract stereotypical conceptions of the submissiveness of slaves.   While studying at Pasadena City College, Butler heard a young man from the Black Power Movement express his contempt for older generations of African Americans for what he considered their shameful submission to white power. Butler realized the young man did not have enough context to understand the necessity to accept abuse just to keep oneself and one's family alive and well. Thus, Butler resolved to create a modern African-American character, who would go back in time to see how well he (Butler's protagonist was originally male) could withstand the abuses his ancestors had suffered.

As Ashraf A. Rushdy explains, Dana's memories of her enslavement become a record of the "unwritten history" of African Americans, a "recovery of a coherent story explaining Dana's various losses." By living these memories, Dana makes connections between slavery and contemporary late 20th century  social situations, including the exploitation of blue-collar workers, police violence, rape, domestic abuse, and racial segregation.

Trauma and its connection to historical memory (or historical amnesia) 
Kindred reveals the repressed trauma that slavery caused in the United States' collective historical memory. In an interview in 1985, Butler suggested that this trauma comes partly from attempts to forget America's dark past: "I think most people don’t know or don’t realize that at least 10 million blacks were killed just on the way to this country, just during the middle passage....They don’t really want to hear it partly because it makes whites feel guilty." In a later interview with Randall Kenan, Butler explained how debilitating this trauma has been, as she symbolized by having her protagonist lose her left arm. 

She said: 
"I couldn’t really let [Dana] come all the way back. I couldn’t let her return to what she was, I couldn’t let her come back whole and [losing her arm], I think, really symbolizes her not coming back whole. Antebellum slavery didn’t leave people quite whole."

Many academics have extended Dana's loss as a metaphor for the "lasting damage of slavery on the African American psyche"  to include other meanings. For example,  Pamela Bedore interprets it as the loss of Dana's naïvete regarding the supposed progress of racial relations in the present. For Ashraf Rushdy, Dana's missing arm is the price she must pay for her  attempt to change history. Robert Crossley quotes Ruth Salvaggio as inferring that the amputation of Dana's left arm is a distinct "birthmark" that represents a part of a "disfigured heritage."  Scholars have also noted the importance of Kevin having his forehead scarred during his travel to the past. Diana R. Paulin argues that it symbolizes Kevin's changing understanding of racial realities, which constitute "a painful and intellectual experience."

Race as social construct 

The construction of the concept of "race" and its connections to slavery are central themes in Butler's novel. Mark Bould and Sherryl Vint place Kindred as a key science fiction literary text of the 1960s and 1970s black consciousness period, noting that Butler uses the time travel trope to underscore the perpetuation of past racial discrimination into the present and, perhaps, the future of America. The lesson of Dana's trips to the past, then, is that "we cannot escape or repress our racist history but instead must confront it and thereby reduce its power to pull us back, unthinkingly, to earlier modes of consciousness and interaction."

The novel's focus on how the system of slavery shapes its central characters dramatizes society's power to construct raced identities. The reader witnesses the development of Rufus from a relatively decent boy allied to Dana to a "complete racist" who attempts to rape her as an adult. Similarly, Dana and Kevin's prolonged stay in the past reframes their modern attitudes. Butler's depiction of her principal character as an independent, self-possessed, educated African-American woman defies slavery's racist and sexist objectification of black people and women.

Kindred also challenges the fixity of "race" through the interracial relationships that form its emotional core. Dana's kinship to Rufus disproves America's erroneous concepts of racial purity. It also represents the "inseparability" of whites and blacks in America. The negative reactions of characters in the past and the present to Dana and Kevin's interracial relationship highlight the continuing hostility of both white and black communities to interracial mixing. At the same time, the relationship of Dana and Kevin extends the concept of "community" from  people related by ethnicity to people related by shared experience. In these new communities, whites and black people may acknowledge their common racist past and learn to live together.

The depiction of Dana's white husband, Kevin, also serves to examine the concept of racial and gender privilege. In the present, Kevin seems unconscious of the benefits he derives from his skin color ,as well as of the way his actions serve to disenfranchise Dana. Once he goes to the past, however, he must not just resist accepting slavery as the normal state of affairs, but dissociate himself from the unrestricted power white males enjoy as their privilege. His prolonged stay in the past transforms him from a naive white man oblivious about racial issues into an anti-slave activist fighting racial oppression.

Strong female protagonist 

In her article "Feminisms," Jane Donawerth describes Kindred as a product of more than two decades of recovery of women's history and literature that began in the 1970s. The republication of a significant number of slave narratives, as well as the work of Angela Davis, who highlighted the heroic resistance of the black female slave, introduced science fiction writers such as Octavia Butler and Suzy McKee Charnas to a literary form that redefined the heroism of the protagonist as endurance, survival, and escape. As Lisa Yaszek notes further, many of these African-American woman's neo-slave narratives, including Kindred, discard the lone male hero in favor of a female hero immersed in family and community. Robert Crossley sees Butler's novel as an extension of the slave women's memoirs exemplified by texts such as Harriet Ann Jacobs' Incidents in the Life of a Slave Girl, especially in its portrayal of the compromises the heroine must make, the endurance she must have, and her ultimate resistance to victimization.

Originally, Butler intended for the protagonist of Kindred to be a man, but as she explained in her interview, she could not do so because a man would immediately be "perceived as dangerous": "[s]o many things that he did would have been likely to get him killed. He wouldn't even have time to learn the rules...of submission." She realized that sexism could aid a female protagonist, "who might be equally dangerous" but "would not be perceived so."

Most scholars see Dana as an example of a strong female protagonist. Angelyn Mitchell describes Dana as a black woman "strengthened by her racial pride, her personal responsibility, her free will, and her self-determination." Identifying Dana as one of Butler's many strong female black heroes, Grace McEntee explains how Dana attempts to transform Rufus into a caring individual despite her struggles with a white patriarchy. These struggles, Missy Dehn Kubitschek explains, are clearly represented by Dana's resistance to white male control of a crucial aspect of her identity—her writing—both in the past and in the present. Sherryl Vint argues that, by refusing to have Dana be reduced to a raped body, Butler would seem to be aligning her protagonist with "the sentimental heroines who would rather die than submit to rape" and thus "allows Dana to avoid a crucial aspect of the reality of female enslavement." However, by risking death by killing Rufus, Dana becomes a permanent surviving record of the mutilation of her black ancestors, both through her one-armed body and by becoming "the body who writes Kindred." In contrast to these views, Beverly Friend believes Dana represents the helplessness of modern woman and that Kindred demonstrates that women have been and continue to be victims in a world run by men.

Female quest for emancipation 

Some scholars consider Kindred as part of Butler's larger project to empower black women. Robert Crossley sees Butler' science fiction narratives as generating a "black feminist aesthetic" that speaks not only to the sociopolitical "truths" of the African-American experience, but specifically to the female experience, as Butler focuses on "women who lack power and suffer abuse but are committed to claiming power over their own lives and to exercising that power harshly when necessary." Given that Butler makes Dana go from liberty to bondage and back to liberty beginning on the day of her birthday, Angelyn Mitchell views Kindred as a revision of the "female emancipatory narrative" exemplified by Harriet A. Jacobs's Incidents in the Life of a Slave Girl, with Butler's story engaging in themes such as female sexuality, individualism, community, motherhood, and, most importantly, freedom in order to illustrate the types of female agency that are capable of resisting enslavement.

 Similarly, Missy Dehn Kubistchek reads Butler's novel as "African-American woman’s quest for understanding history and self" which ends with Dana extending the concept of "kindred" to include both her black and white heritage, as well as her white husband, while "insisting on her right to self definition."

The meaning of the novel's title 
Kindred’s title has several meanings: at its most literal, it refers to the genealogical link between its modern-day protagonist, the slave-holding Weylins, and both the free and bonded Greenwoods; at its most universal, it points to the kinship of all Americans regardless of ethnic background.

Since Butler’s novel challenges readers to come to terms with slavery and its legacy, one significant meaning of the term "kindred" is the United States’ history of miscegenation and its denial by official discourses. The literal kinship of black people and whites must be acknowledged if America is to move into a better future.

On the other hand, as Ashraf H. A. Rushdy contends, Dana's journey to the past serves to redefine her concept of kinship from blood ties to that of "spiritual kinship" with those she chooses as her family: the Weylin slaves and her white husband, Kevin. This sense of the term "kindred" as a community of choice is clear from Butler's first use of the word to indicate Dana and Kevin's similar interests and shared beliefs. Dana and Kevin's relationship, in particular, signals the way for black and white America to reconcile: they must face the country's racist past together so they can learn to co-exist as kindred.

Genre
Publishers and academics have had a hard time categorizing Kindred. In an interview with Randall Kenan, Butler stated that she considered Kindred "literally" as "fantasy." According to Pamela Bedore, Butler's novel is difficult to classify because it includes both elements of the slave narrative and science fiction. Frances Smith Foster insists Kindred does not have one genre and is in fact a blend of "realistic science fiction, grim fantasy, neo-slave narrative, and initiation novel." Sherryl Vint describes the narrative as a fusion of the fantastical and the real, resulting in a book that is "partly historical novel, partly slave narrative, and partly the story of how a twentieth century black woman comes to terms with slavery as her own and her nation's past."

Critics who emphasize Kindred’s exploration of the grim realities of antebellum slavery tend to classify it mainly as a neo-slave narrative. Jane Donawerth traces Butler's novel to the recovery of slave narratives during the 1960s, a form then adapted by female science fiction writers to their own fantastical worlds. Robert Crossley identifies Kindred as "a distinctive contribution to the genre of neo-slave narrative" and places it along Margaret Walker’s Jubilee, David Bradley’s The Chaneysville Incident, Sherley Anne Williams’s Dessa Rose, Toni Morrison’s Beloved, and Charles R. Johnson’s Middle Passage. Sandra Y. Govan calls the novel "a significant departure" from the science fiction narrative not only because it is connected to "anthropology and history via the historical novel," but also because it links "directly to the black American slave experiences via the neo-slave narrative." Noting that Dana begins the story as a free black woman who becomes enslaved, Marc Steinberg labels Kindred  an "inverse slave narrative."

Still, other scholars insist that Butler's background in science fiction is key to our understanding of what type of narrative Kindred is. Dana's time traveling, in particular, has caused critics to place Kindred along science fiction narratives that question "the nature of historical reality," such as Kurt Vonnegut's "time-slip" novel Slaughterhouse Five and Philip K. Dick’s The Man in the High Castle, or that warn against "negotiat[ing] the past through a single frame of reference," as in William Gibson's "The Gernsback Continuum." In her article "A Grim Fantasy,"  Lisa Yaszek argues that Butler adapts two tropes of science fiction—time-travel and the encounter with the alien Other—to "re-present African-American women’s histories." Raffaella Baccolini further identifies Dana's time traveling as a modification of the "grandfather paradox" and notices Butler's use of another typical science fiction element: the narrative's lack of correlation between time passing in the past and time passing in the present.

Style 
Kindred ‘s plot is non linear; rather, it begins in the middle of its end and contains several flashbacks that connect events in the present and past. In an interview, Butler acknowledged that she split the ending into a "Prologue" and an "Epilogue" so as to "involve the reader and make him or her ask a lot of questions" that could not be answered until the end of the story. Missy Dehn Kubitschek sees this framing of Dana's adventures as Butler's way to highlight the significance of slavery to what Americans consider their contemporary identity. Because "Prologue" occurs after Dana travels in time and "Epilogue" concludes with a message on the necessity to confront the past, we experience the story as Dana's understanding of what we have yet to understand ourselves, while the "Epilogue" speaks about the importance of this understanding. Roslyn Nicole Smith proposes that Butler's framing of the story places Dana literally and figuratively in media res so as to take her out of that in media res; that is, to indicate Dana's movement from "a historically fragmented Black woman, who defines herself solely on her contemporary experiences" to "a historically integrated identity" who has knowledge of and a connection to her history.

Kindred ’s story is further fragmented by Dana’s report of her time traveling, which uses flashbacks to connect the present to the past. Robert Crossley sees this "foreshortening" of the past and present as a "lesson in historical realities." Because the story is told from the first-person point of view of Dana, readers feel they are witnessing firsthand the cruelty and hardships that many slaves faced every day in the South and so identify with Dana's gut-wrenching reactions to the past. This autobiographical voice, along with Dana's harrowing recollection of the brutality of slavery and her narrow escape from it, is one of the key elements that have made critics classify Kindred as a neo-slave narrative.

Another strategy Butler uses to add dramatic interest to Kindred’s story is the deliberate delay of the description of Dana and Kevin’s ethnicities. Butler has stated in an interview she did not want to give their "race" away yet since it would have less of an impact and the reader would not react the way that she wanted them to. Dana's ethnicity becomes revealed in chapter two, "The Fire," while Kevin's ethnicity becomes clear to the reader in chapter three, "The Fall," which also includes the history of Dana's and Kevin's interracial relationship.

Butler also uses Alice as Dana's doppelgänger to compare how their decisions are a reflection of their environment. According to Missy Dehn Kubitschek, each woman seems to see a reflection of herself in the other; each is the vision of what could be (could have been) the possible fate of the other given different circumstances. According to Bedore, Butler's use of repetition blurs the lines between the past and present relationships. As time goes on, Alice and Rufus’ relationship begins to seem more like a miserable married couple while Dana and Kevin become somewhat distant.

Background 

Butler wrote Kindred specifically to respond to a young man involved in black consciousness raising. He felt ashamed of what he considered the subservience of older generations of African Americans, saying they were traitors and he wanted to kill them. Butler disagreed with this view. She believed that a historical context had to be given so that the lives of the older generations of African Americans could be understood as the silent, courageous resistance that it was, a means of survival. She decided to create a contemporary character and send her (originally it was a him) back to slavery, to explore how difficult a modern person would find it to survive in such harsh conditions. As Butler said in a 2004 interview with Allison Keyes, she "set out to make people feel history."

Butler's field research in Maryland also influenced her writing of Kindred. She traveled to the Eastern Shore to Talbot County where she wandered a bit. She also conducted research at the Enoch Pratt Free Library in Baltimore and the Maryland Historical Society. She toured Mount Vernon, the plantation home of America's first president, George Washington. At the time, guides referred to the slaves as "servants" and avoided referring to the estate as a former slave plantation. Butler also spent time reading slave narratives, including the autobiography of Fredrick Douglass, who escaped and became an abolitionist leader. She read many grim accounts, but decided she needed to moderate events in her book in order to attract enough readers.

Reception
Kindred is Butler's bestseller, with Beacon Press advertising it as "the classic novel that has sold more than 450,000 copies."

Among Butler's peers, the novel has been well received. Speculative writer Harlan Ellison has praised Kindred as "that rare magical artifact… the novel one returns to again and again", while writer Walter Mosley described the novel as "everything the literature of science fiction can be."

Book reviewers were enthusiastic. Los Angeles Herald-Examiner writer Sam Frank described the novel as "[a] shattering work of art with much to say about love, hate, slavery, and racial dilemmas, then and now." Reviewer Sherley Anne Williams from Ms. defined the novel as "a startling and engrossing commentary on the complex actuality and continuing heritage of American slavery. Seattle Post-Intelligencer writer John Marshall said that Kindred is "the perfect introduction to Butler’s work and perspectives for those not usually enamored of science fiction." The Austin Chronicle writer Barbara Strickland declared Kindred to be "as much a novel of psychological horror as it is a novel of science fiction."

High school and college courses have frequently chosen Kindred as a text to be read. Linell Smith of The Baltimore Sun describes it as "a celebrated mainstay of college courses in women's studies and black literature and culture."  Speaking at the occasion of Beacon Press' reissue of Kindred for its 25th Anniversary, African-American literature professor Roland L. Williams said that the novel has remained popular over the years because of its crossover appeal, which "continues to find a variety of audiences--fantasy, literary and historical" and because "it is an exceedingly well-written and compelling story… that asks you to look back in time and at the present simultaneously."

Communities and organizations also choose this novel for common reading events. In 2003, Rochester, New York selected Kindred as the novel to be read during the third annual "If All of Rochester Read the Same Book."  Approximately 40,000 to 50,000 people participated by reading Kindred and joining panel discussions, lectures, film viewings, visual arts exhibitions, poetry readings, and other events from February 2003 until March 2003. The town discussed the book in local groups, and from March 4–7 met Octavia Butler during her appearances at colleges, community centers, libraries, and bookstores. In the spring of 2012, Kindred was chosen as one of thirty books to be given away as part of World Book Night, a worldwide event conducted to encourage love for books and reading by giving away hundreds of thousand of free paperbacks in one night.

Adaptations
Seeing Ear Theatre. "Kindred: An Online Dramatic Presentation." 2001.  (This audio play adaptation stars Alfre Woodard as "Dana" and was produced by Brian Smith and Jacqueline Cuscuna for Seeing Ear Theatre. It also features award-winning actresses Lynn Whitfield and Ruby Dee.)
Duffy, Damian (Adapter) and John Jennings (Illustrator). Kindred: A Graphic Novel Adaptation. Abrams ComicArts. January 10, 2017.  (10)  (13)

Television 

In March 2021, it was announced that FX had given the production a pilot order for a television adaptation of the novel. In January 2022, it was announced that FX had given the production a series order for a first season consisting of 8 episodes, starring Mallori Johnson as Dana, Micah Stock as Kevin, Ryan Kwanten as Tom Weylin, Gayle Rankin as Margaret Weylin, Austin Smith as Luke, Sophina Brown as Sarah, and David Alexander Kaplan as Rufus Weylin. It is produced by FX Productions, with Branden Jacobs-Jenkins as showrunner. The series premiered all 8 episodes on December 13, 2022, on Hulu. The episodes of season one cover the first three chapters of the novel, The River, The Fire, and The Fall, though some major changes from the novel have been made for the series, including setting the current day in 2016 rather than 1976, having Dana and Kevin not married but in a new relationship, and adding Dana's mother Olivia as a new character who also travels through time. Though FX has not officially renewed the series, a second season is planned.

References

Further reading

Reviews
 Russ, Joanna. "Books." The Magazine of Fantasy and Science Fiction (Feb. 1980): 94–101. 
 Snyder, John C. "Kindred by Octavia E. Butler." SciFiDimensions. June 2004.

Scholarship
Beaulieu, Elizabeth Ann. "'So Many Relatives': Twentieth-Century Women Meet Their Pasts." Black Women Writers and the American Neo-Slave Narrative: Femininity Unfettered. Westport, CT: Greenwood, 1999. 109–136.
Bast, Florian. "'No.': The Narrative Theorizing of Embodied Agency in Octavia Butler's Kindred." Extrapolation: A Journal of Science Fiction and Fantasy 53.2 (2012): 151–81.
Dubey, Madhu. "Speculative Fictions of Slavery." American Literature 82.4 (2010): 779–805.
Hua, Linh U. "Reproducing Time, Reproducing History: Love And Black Feminist Sentimentality in Octavia Butler's Kindred. African American Review 44.3 (2011): 391-407.
Jesser, Nancy. "Blood, Genes and Gender in Octavia Butler's Kindred and Dawn." Extrapolation 43.1 (2002): 36+.
Knabe, Susan and Wendy Gay Pearson. "'Gambling Against History': Queer Kinship and Cruel Optimism in Octavia Butler's Kindred." Strange Matings: Science Fiction, Feminism, African American Voices, and Octavia E. Butler. Ed. Rebecca J. Holden and Nisi Shawl. Seattle, WA : Aqueduct Press, 2013. 51–78.
LaCroix, David. "To Touch Solid Evidence: The Implicity of Past and Present in Octavia E. Butler's Kindred." The Journal of the Midwest Modern Language Association 40.1 (Spring, 2007): 109–119.
Levecq, Christine. "Power and Repetition: Philosophies of (Literary) History in Octavia E. Butler’s Kindred." Contemporary Literature 41.3 (Fall 2000): 525–553.
Long, Lisa. "A Relative Pain: The Rape of History in Octavia Butler’s Kindred and Phyllis Alesia Perry's Stigmata." College English 64.4 (Mar. 2002): 459–483.
McKible, Adam. "'These Are the Facts of the Darky's History': Thinking History and Reading Names in Four African American Texts." African American Review 28.2 (Summer 1994): 223–235.
Parham, Marisa. "Saying 'Yes': Textual Traumas in Octavia Butler's Kindred." Middle Eastern & North African Writers 32.4 (Winter 2009): 1315–1331.
Reed, Brian K. "Behold the Woman: The Imaginary Wife in Octavia Butler’s Kindred." CLA Journal Al (Sept. 2003): 66–74.
Spaulding, A. Timothy. "The Conflation of Time in Ishmael Reed’s Flight to Canada and Octavia Butler’s Kindred." Re-forming the Past: History, the Fantastic, and the Postmodern Slave Narrative. Columbus: Ohio State UP, 2005. 25–60.
Tettenborn, Eva. "Teaching Imagined Testimony: Kindred, Unchained Memories, and The African Burial Ground in Manhattan." Transformations 16.2 (Fall 2005): 87–103.
Thompson, Carlyle van. "Moving Past the Present: Racialized Sexual Violence and Miscegenous Consumption in Octavia Butler’s Kindred." Eating the Black Body: Miscegenation as Sexual Consumption in African American Literature and Culture. New York: Peter Lang, 2006. 107–144. 
Turner, Stephanie S. "'What Actually Is': The Insistence of Genre in Octavia Butler's Kindred." FEMSPEC 4.2 (2004): 259–280.
Wagers, Kelley. "Seeing 'From the Far Side of the Hill': Narrative, History, and Understanding in Kindred and The Chaneysville Incident." MELUS 34.1 (Spring, 2009): 23–45. 	
Wood, Sarah. "Exorcizing the Past: The Slave Narrative as Historical Fantasy." Feminist 85 (2007): 83–96.
Flagel, Nadine. "'It's Almost Like Being There': Speculative Fiction, Slave Narrative, and the Crisis of Representation in Octavia Butler's Kindred." Canadian Review of American Studies 42.2 (2012): 216–45.
Robertson, Benjamin. "'Some Matching Strangeness': Biology, Politics, and The Embrace of History in Octavia Butler's Kindred." Science Fiction Studies 37.3 (2010): 362–381.

Poetry
VanMeenen, Karen, ed. Residue of Time: Poets Respond to Kindred. Rochester, NY: Writers & Books, 2003. [Part of Writers & Books' annual community-wide reading program "If All of Rochester Read the Same Book."]

External links

Kindred, audiobook at the Internet Archive.

Kindred Reader's Guide: An Interview With Octavia Butler; part of Writers & Books 'If All of Rochester Read the Same Book' event - adopted Kindred as Rochester, New York's book of the year for 2003.

Fiction set in 1815
Fiction set in 1976
Novels set in the 1810s
Novels set in the 1970s
Novels about time travel
1979 fantasy novels
Novels set in Maryland
1979 American novels
Feminist science fiction novels
1979 science fiction novels
Novels by Octavia Butler
Novels about American slavery
Doubleday (publisher) books
Literature by African-American women
Easton, Maryland
American novels adapted into television shows